Kimberly Laferrière is a graduate of the Neighborhood Playhouse in NYC and the Canadian Film Center in Toronto. She has appeared in successful television series in both French and English in the US and Canada. Her recent work includes the role of Natasha in the popular TV series Fugueuse which was nominated for a Prix Gémeaux in 2018, as well as ABC’s In The Dark, Netflix’s 21 Thunder and the ground breaking Féminin Féminin by Chloe Robichaud.

References

External links

 

Living people
Actresses from Quebec
1984 births
Canadian film actresses
Canadian stage actresses
Canadian television actresses
French Quebecers